Dichomeris antiloxa is a moth of the family Gelechiidae. It was described by Edward Meyrick in 1931. It is known from Sichuan and Jiangsu provinces in China.

References

antiloxa
Moths described in 1931
Taxa named by Edward Meyrick